Tori Kewish (born 5 May 1997) is an Australian professional darts player who plays in World Darts Federation (WDF) events.

Career
In December 2019, Kewish qualified for the 2020 BDO World Darts Championship as the 15th seed after Trina Gulliver withdrew from the tournament due to illness. She lost to Beau Greaves in the first round.

In 2022, Kewish qualified for the 2022 WDF World Darts Championship She went on a good run defeating Lorraine Hyde & Deta Hedman without dropping a set. She reached the Quarter final where she lost a close match to Lorraine Winstanley 2-1. Kewish has also qualified for the 2022 Australian Darts Open, Which is due to be played in August. 

Kewish has won 25 WDF titles in Australia in her career to date.

World Championship results

BDO/WDF
 2020: First round (lost to Beau Greaves 0–2)
 2022: Quarter-finals (lost to Lorraine Winstanley 1–2)

References

External links
 

Living people
Australian darts players
Female darts players
1997 births